Diego Ciccone (born 21 July 1987) is a Swiss professional footballer who plays as a midfielder for SC Veltheim.

Professional career
During his senior career Ciccone has played in the Swiss football league system representing two clubs, St. Gallen and Vaduz, and also Liechtenstein Football Cup with Vaduz. Ciccone has won the Swiss second tier, Swiss Challenge League, twice (once with St. Gallen in 2009 and once with Vaduz in 2014) and the Liechtenstein Football Cup four times with Vaduz (2011, 2013, 2014 and 2015).

On 2 July 2015, Ciccone scored the final goal in the first leg of 2015–16 UEFA Europa League first qualifying round in a 5–0 win against San Marinese La Fiorita, giving Vaduz an advantage ahead of the second leg in Liechtenstein.

On 15 August 2019 SC Veltheim announced, that Ciccone had joined the club.

Personal life
Ciccone is of Italian descent.

Career statistics

Notes

Honours
St. Gallen
 Swiss Challenge League (1): 2008–09
Vaduz
 Swiss Challenge League (1): 2013–14
 Liechtenstein Football Cup (6): 2010–11, 2012–13, 2013–14, 2014–15, 2015–16, 2016-17

References

External links 

1987 births
FC Vaduz players
Swiss expatriate footballers
Swiss expatriate sportspeople in Liechtenstein
Expatriate footballers in Liechtenstein
Association football midfielders
Swiss men's footballers
Swiss people of Italian descent
Living people
Swiss Super League players
Swiss Challenge League players
FC St. Gallen players
FC Rapperswil-Jona players
SC Young Fellows Juventus players
People from Winterthur
Sportspeople from the canton of Zürich